George Rowland Hill  ( – 15 February 1930) was a British sailor and soldier who was awarded the New Zealand Cross for his actions at Mohaka during Te Kooti's War. Throughout the Crimean War, he served in the Royal Navy, obtaining the Sebastopol bar before having involvement in the Expedition of the Thousand while serving on board the HMS Hannibal. After jumping ship near Auckland, Hill fell in with Von Tempsky's Forest Rangers in 1863, serving with them until joining the Armed Constabulary.

References

1837 births
1930 deaths
Military personnel from Devon
People of the New Zealand Wars
Recipients of the New Zealand Cross (1869)